Playin' for Keeps is an album by saxophonist Bunky Green recorded in Chicago and released by the Argo label in 1965.

Reception

AllMusic reviewer Jason Ankeny stated: "As its title suggests, Testifyin' Time channels elements of gospel but otherwise eschews tradition and cliché, bolstering its modern jazz sensibilities with nods to the emerging Chicago soul sound. ... Bunky Green flourishes in the session's hip, contemporary mode, uncorking a series of nimble alto solos galvanized by a communal joie de vivre that elevates the entire session beyond the norm. And like most of Green's Argo sessions, Testifyin' Time boasts a thoughtful song selection as well".

Track listing 
 "Testifyin' Time" (Edith Green) – 3:37
 "Silver Dollar" (Jack Palmer, Clarke Van Ness) – 3:39
 "Tamra"  (Billy Wallace) – 4:17
 "On Green Dolphin Street" (Bronisław Kaper, Ned Washington) – 5:21
 "Tweedlee Dee" (Winfield Scott) – 4:21
 "My Ship" (Kurt Weill, Ira Gershwin) – 4:03
 "Orbit Six"  (Edith Green) – 3:27
 "When the Sun Comes Out" (Harold Arlen, Ted Koehler) – 4:31

Personnel 
Bunky Green - alto saxophone
James Meyer – tenor saxophone (tracks 1-3 & 5-8)
Walter Strickland - trumpet (tracks 1-3 & 5-8)
Billy Wallace – piano
Cleveland Eaton – bass
Marshall Thompson – drums

References 

1965 albums
Argo Records albums
Bunky Green albums
Albums produced by Esmond Edwards